Taringa armata is a species of sea slug, a dorid nudibranch, shell-less marine opisthobranch gastropod mollusks in the family Discodorididae.

Distribution
This species was described from 4 km west of the harbour of Antalya, Turkey, . It is known from the Adriatic Sea, eastern Mediterranean Sea.

References

Discodorididae
Gastropods described in 1961